The Voice Squad was a traditional Irish singing group from Ireland. The members included Gerry Cullen, Phil Callery and Fran McPhail. They recorded four albums and toured Ireland, the UK and the US.

The Voice Squad had a repertoire of Irish traditional songs and always sang unaccompanied.

They have been compared to English family groups of similar style, such as The Watersons and The Copper Family.

Performances
The group has performed in Ireland, the UK, Europe, and the United States. In October 2002, they performed at the opening of Dublin's newest concert venue, The Helix at Dublin City University. Ireland's President, Mary McAleese, was present at the event. The concert was recorded by RTÉ television for later transmission. The track they chose was Shaun Davey's arrangement of "The Parting Glass".'

In June 2003, the group performed at the opening ceremony of the Special Olympics World Games in Ireland. Along with Rita Connolly and Ronan Tynan, they sang "May We Never Have To Say Goodbye," composed by Shaun Davey. This was the theme song for the games.

"The Voice Squad represent the melding of two related but separate traditions — a British harmony-singing tradition (as exemplified by the Copper Family and the Watersons) and the unaccompanied solo singing tradition of Northern Ireland (as exemplified by such legendary artists as Paddy Tunney and Joe Heaney). By taking the traditional Irish repertoire and harmonizing it in a generally British style, the three members of the Voice Squad have created something new and absolutely wonderful. All three singers have excellent voices, but tenor Fran McPhail is the one who brings something tonally unique to the ensemble; his voice has an eerie, almost horn-like quality that blends beautifully with the harder-edged voices of tenor Phil Callery and baritone Gerry Cullen. - Rick Anderson, Allmusic

Recordings
The Voice Squad recorded four albums, including Good People All which was a re-release of Holly Wood with the same tracks.
Many's The Foolish Youth, 1987, Tara, TARACD4004
Holly Wood, 1992, TARA 4013
Good People All, 1993
Concerning of Three Young Men, 2014, Tara, TARA4013

References

Irish folk musical groups